Vancouver Rehearsal Tapes is an EP released by the American rock band R.E.M. on October 14, 2003. The band recorded several songs in Vancouver on May 10, 2003 as a warm-up for their tour promoting In Time: The Best of R.E.M. 1988–2003. It was only available through the Apple iTunes shop, as with the later releases iTunes Originals – R.E.M. and Live from London.

Track listing
All songs written by Bill Berry, Peter Buck, Mike Mills, and Michael Stipe except where noted:
"Maps and Legends" – 3:18 (originally from Fables of the Reconstruction)
"Tongue" – 3:51 (originally from Monster)
"Little America" – 2:59 (originally from Reckoning)
"So. Central Rain (I'm Sorry)" – 3:28 (originally from Reckoning)
"Imitation of Life" – 3:50 (originally from Reveal, written by Buck, Mills, and Stipe)

2003 EPs
ITunes-exclusive releases
R.E.M. live albums
R.E.M. EPs
Live EPs
2003 live albums
Albums produced by Mike Mills
Albums produced by Michael Stipe
Albums produced by Peter Buck